The Dat So La Lee House, which is located at 331 W. Proctor St. in Carson City, Nevada, is a historic house that is listed on the National Register of Historic Places.  It was a home of Dat So La Lee (ca. 1845/1855–1925), a woman who also was known as Louisa Keyser, who was a well-known Washoe Indian basket weaver. The house, also known as the Louisa Keyser House, was listed on the National Register in 1994.

The house is a modest one-story board and batten cottage built by Abram Cohn, husband of Clarrise Amy Cohn, who was Louisa's promoter.  At time of NRHP listing, the house was still a residence.  It faces north onto West Proctor Street, but is set back about 40 feet behind a small lawn and parking area.

References

External links
Dat So La Lee House at National Park Service

Houses on the National Register of Historic Places in Nevada
Houses completed in 1914
National Register of Historic Places in Carson City, Nevada
Houses in Carson City, Nevada